Two Headed Monster is the sixth studio album by Collide, released on September 23, 2008, by Noiseplus Music.

Reception
Chain D.L.K. said "every corner turned by another track on Two Headed Monster holds a dark and delicious delight" and "there are enough mood and tempo changes, enough twisted sonics, potently placed power chords, dynamic shifts and compelling rhythms to satisfy the most demanding alt rock listeners."

Track listing

Personnel
Adapted from the Two Headed Monster liner notes.

Collide
 Eric Anest (as Statik) – noises, production, mixing, illustrations
 Karin Johnston (as Tripp9) – vocals, illustrations

Additional performers
 Danny Carey – additional drums (1, 2, 4, 5)
 Dean Garcia – bass guitar (2)
 Kai Kurosawa – bass guitar (3-5, 7-9)
 Scott Landes – additional guitar (4, 5, 10)
 Chaz Pease – additional drums (2-5, 8)
 Rogerio Silva – additional guitar (1-6, 8, 9)

Production and design
 Chris Bellman – mastering
 Glenn Campbell – photography
 Dan Santoni – photography
 Derek Caballero – cover art, photography

Release history

References

External links 
 Two Headed Monster at collide.net
 
 Two Headed Monster at Bandcamp
 Two Headed Monster at iTunes

Collide (band) albums
2008 albums